Clément Chéroux (born 1970) is a French photography historian and curator. He is Chief Curator of Photography at the Museum of Modern Art in New York City. He has also held senior curatorial positions at the Centre Pompidou in Paris and at the San Francisco Museum of Modern Art. Chéroux has overseen many exhibitions and books on photographers and photography.

He has been awarded the Prix Nadar (with Quentin Bajac) and a Royal Norwegian Order of Merit (Knight).

Early life and education
Chéroux was born in Vélizy-Villacoublay, in the south-western suburbs of Paris.

Life and work
For ten years Chéroux taught history of photography at the University of Paris I, the University of Paris 8 Vincennes-Saint-Denis, and the University of Lausanne.

From 1998 he was executive editor of the magazine .

From 2007 to 2012 he was Curator and from 2013 to 2016 Chief Curator of Photography at the Centre Pompidou in Paris. From 2017 to 2020 he was Senior Curator of Photography at the San Francisco Museum of Modern Art, San Francisco, California. Since 2020 he has been the Joel and Anne Ehrenkranz Chief Curator of Photography at the Museum of Modern Art in New York City.

Publications
L'Expérience photographique d'August Strindberg: du naturalisme au sur-naturalisme. 1994. .
Fautographie, petite histoire de l'erreur photographique. Yellow Now, 2003. .
Fotografie und Geschichte. With Ilsen About. Leipzig: Hochschule für Grafik und Buchkunst Leipzig, 2004.
The Perfect Medium: Photography and the Occult. Yale University Press, 2005. .
Henri Cartier-Bresson: le tir photographique. Découvertes Gallimard. Gallimard, 2008. .
La photographie qui fait mouche. Paris: Librairie Serge Plantureux, 2009.
Diplopie, l'image photographique à l'ère des médias globalisés: essai sur le 11 septembre 2001. le Point du Jour, 2009. .
La Subversion des images, surréalism, photographie, film. Pompidou Centre, 2009. With Quentin Bajac. .
Shoot!: Existential Photography. Revolver, 2010. With Florian Ebner. .
Ombres portées. Paris: Centre Pompidou, 2011.
L'Immagine come punto interrogativo o il valore estatico del documento surrealista. Milan: Johan & Levi, 2012.
Vernaculaires, essais d'histoire de la photographie Cherbourg: le Point du Jour, 2013.
Henri Cartier-Bresson: Ici et maintenant. Paris: Centre Pompidou, 2013. Published on the occasion of an exhibition at the Centre Pompidou, 2014.
Henri Cartier-Bresson: Here and Now. Thames & Hudson, 2014. .
Avant l'avant-garde, du jeu en photographie. Paris: Textuel, 2015.
Magnum Manifesto. Thames & Hudson, 2017. .
Walker Evans. Prestel, 2017. .
Si la vue vaut d'être vécue, miscellanées photographiques (2019)
Louis Stettner: Traveling Light. Cernunnos, 2019. .
La Voix du voir: Les grands entretiens de la Fondation Henri Cartier-Bresson = the voice of seeing: the major talks of the Henri Cartier-Bresson Foundation. Paris: Xavier Barral, 2019. .

Exhibitions curated
Shoot!, Rencontres d'Arles, Arles, France, 2010. Curated by Chéroux, Martin Parr, Erik Kessels, Joan Fontcuberta, and Joachim Schmid.
From Here On, Rencontres d'Arles, Arles, France, 2011
Edvard Munch, l'Oeil Moderne, Pompidou Centre, Paris, 2011/2012; Tate Modern, London, 2012
Paparazzi! Photographers, Stars and Artists, Pompidou Centre, Paris, 2014
Henri Cartier-Bresson, Pompidou Centre, Paris, 2014
Louis Stettner: Here and There, Pompidou Centre, Paris, 2016; Louis Stettner: Traveling Light, San Francisco Museum of Modern Art, San Francisco, California. Curated by Chéroux and Julie Jones.

Awards
2009: Prix Nadar with Quentin Bajac for the book La Subversion des images, surréalism, photographie, film
2015: Royal Norwegian Order of Merit (Knight), for the exhibition Edvard Munch, the Modern Eye

References

21st-century French historians
People associated with the Museum of Modern Art (New York City)
Historians of photography
Photography curators
French art historians
French art curators
Academic staff of the University of Lausanne
Living people
1970 births